Jan Korringa (31 March 1915 – 9 October 2015) was a Dutch American Theoretical Physicist, specializing in theoretical condensed matter physics. He also contributed to the KKR Method.

Education and career
Korringa received his undergraduate degree from the Delft University of Technology. In 1937, Korringa went to Leiden University to pursue graduate studies. Due to the closure of Leiden University, Korringa returned to Delft University of Technology. In 1942, he received a Doctor of Philosophy from Delft University of Technology and published his thesis, Onderzoekingen op het gebied algebraïsche optiek (Essays in the area of algebraic optics). In 1946, Korringa became an associate professor at the University of Leiden. He was a protégé of Hendrik Kramers, who had been the first protégé of Niels Bohr; a large influence on his interest in quantum mechanics.

In 1952, Korringa went to the United States and accepted a full professorship at Ohio State University. He was a consultant at Oak Ridge National Laboratory for many years. During the summers, he collaborated with a group at Chevron Corporation that developed nuclear magnetic resonance logging. In 1962, he was awarded a Guggenheim Foundation fellowship that he used for a sabbatical at the University of Besançon in France.

In a 1947 paper, Korringa showed how his multiple scattering theory (MST) could be used to find the energy as a function of wavevector for electrons in a periodic solid. In 1954, Nobel laureate Walter Kohn and Norman Rostoker, who went on to have a successful career in nuclear physics, derived the same equations using the Kohn variational method. Two of Korringa's students, Sam Faulkner and Harold Davis, started a program at the Oak Ridge National Laboratory using the Korringa-Kohn-Rostoker (KKR) band-theory equations to calculate the properties of solids. The KKR equations are now used around the world and are the subject of several books.

Korringa realized that his equations could be used to calculate the electronic states of nonperiodic solids for which Bloch’s theorem does not hold. In 1958 he published an approach, now called the average t-matrix approximation, for calculating the electronic states in random substitutional alloys. That work continued to evolve and was later connected to the higher-level theory called the Coherent Potential Approximation (CPA). Balázs Győrffy and Malcolm Stocks combined it with the KKR theory to obtain the KKR–CPA method, which is presently used for alloy calculations. Korringa’s MST is the basis for numerous theoretical developments, including the locally self-consistent multiple scattering theory developed by Malcolm Stocks and Yang Wang that can be used to obtain the electronic and magnetic states of any ordered or disordered solid. 

In 1950, Korringa showed that the spin relaxation rate divided by the square of the magnetic resonance field shift (the Knight shift) obtained from an NMR experiment is equal to a constant, κ, times the temperature T. The magnitude of the Korringa constant κ and its possible deviation from a constant value is the signature of the effects of strong correlations in the electron gas.

References

1915 births
2015 deaths
20th-century Dutch physicists
Delft University of Technology alumni
Academic staff of Leiden University
Ohio State University faculty
Theoretical physicists
American centenarians
Men centenarians
People from Heemstede
Dutch centenarians
Dutch emigrants to the United States
Fellows of the American Physical Society